Receptor activity modifying protein 1 is a protein that in humans is encoded by the RAMP1 gene.

The protein encoded by this gene is a member of the RAMP family of single-transmembrane-domain proteins, called receptor (calcitonin) activity modifying proteins (RAMPs). RAMPs are type I transmembrane proteins with an extracellular N terminus and a cytoplasmic C terminus. RAMPs are required to transport calcitonin-receptor-like receptor (CALCRL) to the plasma membrane. CALCRL, a receptor with seven transmembrane domains, can function as either a calcitonin gene-related peptide (CGRP) receptor  or an adrenomedullin receptor, depending on which members of the RAMP family are expressed. In combination with the RAMP1 protein, CALCRL functions as the CGRP receptor. The RAMP1 protein is involved in the terminal glycosylation, maturation, and presentation of the CGRP receptor to the cell surface. The RAMP1 protein can also interact with the calcitonin receptor (CT) protein, where heteromerisation of RAMP1 with CT converts CT from a calcitonin receptor to the amylin receptor AMY1

See also 
 Receptor activity-modifying protein

References

Further reading

External links